Benjamin Howland (July 27, 1755May 1, 1821) was a United States senator from Rhode Island. Born in Tiverton, he attended the common schools, engaged in agricultural pursuits, was collector of taxes in 1801, town auditor in 1802, and town moderator in 1805. He was a member of the Rhode Island House of Representatives in 1810 and a general in the State militia during the War of 1812.

Howland was elected as a Democratic-Republican to the U.S. Senate to fill the vacancy caused by the death of Samuel J. Potter and served from October 29, 1804, until March 3, 1809. He died in Tiverton in 1821; interment was in the family lot on his estate.

References

1755 births
1821 deaths
People from Tiverton, Rhode Island
American militiamen in the War of 1812
Members of the Rhode Island House of Representatives
United States senators from Rhode Island
Rhode Island Democratic-Republicans
Democratic-Republican Party United States senators
American militia generals